Katherine Phillips is an American educator and former vice-principal of the private Al-Bayan Bilingual Middle School in Kuwait, who was detained from leaving the country. Her travel ban caused concern among other foreign educators.

Detention
Her detention stemmed from an incident in which Phillips gave an in-school suspension to three boys for fighting. The father of one of the boys, Fawaz al Marzoug, felt that his son had been improperly treated, moved his children to another school, and threatened Phillips with reprisals. This case in particular had caused widespread concern among US overseas educators.
 
On June 13, 2007, Phillips was at the Kuwait International Airport intending to leave the country. She was stopped at immigration where she was informed that there was a case against her, pending further investigation and that a travel ban had been placed on her 15 months after the incident. Phillips has said, "The parent said that he would make this personal and this seems to be what he is intent upon doing."

The case of Katherine Phillips made headlines in the local and international press after the teacher posted a letter on the Internet asking for help. The incident also sparked comment in many blogs, particularly ones dealing with the issues of Westerners residing in the Middle East, and ones dealing with overseas educators.

The U.S. embassy in Kuwait confirmed in a statement a travel ban had been imposed on her, adding its consular section was in contact with the authorities to help Phillips leave Kuwait as soon as possible.

On Tuesday, 3 July 2007, due to the efforts of Al Bayan Bilingual School management, Kuwaiti legal counsel and the Kuwait Human Rights Society the situation regarding Phillips was resolved, and she was allowed to leave the country.

References

American educators
Living people
Year of birth missing (living people)